Clune is a surname. 

Clune may also refer to:

Clune, Pennsylvania, an unincorporated community in the United States
Clune Arena, a basketball venue at the United States Air Force Academy in Colorado Springs
Clune Building, a historic site in Miami Springs, Florida
Easter Clune Castle, a ruined castle in Scotland
Clune Park, a former football ground in Scotland
Clune's Auditorium, a former name of Hazard's Pavilion, a defunct auditorium in Los Angeles

See also
Cluneal (disambiguation)
Clunes (disambiguation)